Egeno von Konradsburg is the name of the following German nobles:

 Egeno I of Konradsburg, the Elder, one of the free knights of Konradsburg
 Egeno II of Konradsburg, the Younger, one of the free knights of Konradsburg